Steel is a 1979 drama film starring and executive produced by Lee Majors. It was filmed in Lexington, Kentucky, and the surrounding Fayette County. The film was directed by Steve Carver and stars Lee Majors, Jennifer O'Neill, Art Carney, and George Kennedy.

Cast
 Lee Majors as Mike Catton 
 Jennifer O'Neill as Cass Cassidy 
 Art Carney as "Pignose" Moran 
 Harris Yulin as Eddie Cassidy 
 George Kennedy as Lew "Big Lew" Cassidy 
 R. G. Armstrong as Kellin
 Redmond Gleeson as Harry 
 Terry Kiser as Valentino 
 Richard Lynch as Dancer 
 Ben Marley as The Kid 
 Roger E. Mosley as Lionel 
 Albert Salmi as "Tank"
 Robert Tessier as "Cherokee"
 Hunter von Leer as Surfer

Production
The film was shot in Kentucky and at one stage was called Look Down and Die. 

Stuntman A.J. Bakunas died in an accident on September 21, 1978, while doubling a fall for George Kennedy.

References

External links
 
 

1979 films
1979 drama films
Films shot in Kentucky
American drama films
Films produced by William N. Panzer
Films scored by Michel Colombier
1970s English-language films
1970s American films